4-Hydroxyphenylglycine (HPG) is a non-proteogenic amino acid found in vancomycin and related glycopeptides. HPG is synthesized from the shikimic acid pathway and requires four enzymes to synthesize: Both L- and D-HPG are used in the vancomycin class of antibiotics. Tyrosine, a similar amino acid, differs by a methylene group (CH2) between the aromatic ring and the alpha carbon.

Biosynthesis 

HPG is synthesized from prephenate, an intermediate in the shikimic acid pathway and also a precursor to tyrosine. Prephenate is aromatized by prephenate dehydrogenase (Pdh) using NAD+ as a cofactor to produce 4-hydroxyphenylpyruvate. 4-Hydroxyphenylpyruvate is then oxidized by 4-hydroxymandelate synthase (4HmaS) using oxygen to form 4-hydroxymandelate and hydrogen peroxide. 4HmaS is a non-heme iron-dependent dioxygenase. The reaction mechanism of this unique oxidation was proposed by Choroba et al in 2000

4-Hydroxymandelate is subsequently oxidized by hydroxymandelate oxidase (Hmo) to 4-hydroxylbenzoylformate, using FMN as a cofactor. Finally, 4-hydroxyphenylglycine transaminase (HpgT) transfers an ammonia moiety from a donor to 4-hydroxylbenzoylformate to form HPG. Several different molecules can serve as the nitrogen donor for the transamination, however, Hubbard et al suspect L-tyrosine to serve as the most efficient donor. By doing so, the following cycle is constructed:

HPG is also synthesized in Herpetosiphon aurantiacus using enzymes Haur_(1871,1887,1888).

See also 
Vancomycin
Oritavancin
Glycopeptide antibiotics

References 

Non-proteinogenic amino acids